Samokov is a town in Sofia Province in the southwest of Bulgaria. It is situated in a basin between the mountains Rila and Vitosha, 55 kilometres from the capital Sofia. Due to the suitable winter sports conditions, Samokov, together with the nearby resort Borovets, is a major tourist centre.

In the past, Samokov was a centre of handicrafts and art, with notable figures like Zahari Zograf, Hristo Dimitrov and Nikola Obrazopisov. The town's name is a compound word of "samo" and "kov", respectively meaning "self" and the root of the verb "forge, hammer", and comes from the samokov, a mechanical forge powered by water, since the town of Samokov was a major iron-producing centre during the Middle Ages.

History
It is thought that Samokov was founded in the 14th century as a mining settlement with the assistance of Saxon miners. It was first mentioned in 1455 and in Ottoman registers of 1477 as Vlaychov Samokov. Some of the best craftsmen, woodcarving masters and builders came from Samokov and were recognized for their skills in creating detailed and impressive woodcarvings, painting beautiful icons and building unique architecture.

In fact Samokov was one of the then famous three woodcarving schools in the region, the other two being Debar and Bansko. Their work can be seen in many churches and cultural buildings throughout the Balkan Peninsula. Between the 14th and 18th centuries, Samokov was established as an administrative center for iron ore mining by the ruling Ottoman Empire. From the 16th century until the abolishment of the Serbian patriarchate in 1766, Samokov was the seat of the easternmost eparchy of the Serbian Orthodox Church.

In the 16th and 17th centuries, it grew into the greatest iron extraction centre in the region, with western travellers describing it as 'a fairly large city'. In 1565–1566, Samokov had to produce and deliver to Belgrade 20,000 horseshoes and 30,000 nails. Samokov also produced anchors and other materials for the shipyards of the Bulgarian Black Sea Coast, particularly Pomorie. As the logging industry was also well developed, in 1573 the people of Samokov had to deliver 300 beams as far as Mecca.

As of today, some Aromanians live in Samokov.

Sports

A large modern sports arena for basketball, volleyball, boxing, wrestling, judo and more was opened on 8 March 2008. Its cost is estimated to 16 million lev. There is also a skiing centre in Samokov for cross country skiing, a small alpine hill and a snowboard park. Bulgaria's only ski-jumping hill Chernia kos is located in Samokov. It is a fairly small hill, K-40 metres with a 45-metre jump. The hill is very old and needs to be renovated. The local team is FC Rilski Sportist Samokov.

Geography
Samokov is situated in a basin between the mountains Rila and Vitosha, 55 kilometres from the capital Sofia.

Climate
Samokov has a humid continental climate (Köppen climate classification Dfb) with an average annual temperature of approximately 9 °C (48 °F). The altitude of 950 metres, in the skirts of Rila mountain, and the mitigating proximity to the continental mediterranean climate zone, are both strong factors in forming the climate.

Summers vary from very warm, sunny and dry to warm and humid, while winter can be relatively mild and wet with much snowfall, but also colder and drier. Spring is often cool and wet, while in autumn there can be numerous sunny, warm days.

Honour
Samokov Knoll on Livingston Island in the South Shetland Islands, Antarctica is named after Samokov.

Notable persons
Mary Haskell (1869–1953) – American missionary at Samokov
Isaac Alcalay (1882–1978) – Chief Rabbi of the Kingdom of Yugoslavia
Sabah Al-Salim Al-Sabah (1913-1977) - Second ruler of Kuwait
Victor Shem-Tov (1915–2014) – Israeli politician
Nicolae Praida (1933-2008) - Romanian actor
Petar Popangelov (* 1959) – Alpine skier
Vladimir Zografski (* 1993) – Ski Jumper, junior world champion

Gallery

References

External links

 
Ski jumping in Bulgaria
Aromanian settlements in Bulgaria